Goin' Home is a duet album by saxophonist Art Pepper and pianist George Cables recorded in 1982 and released on the Galaxy label.

Reception

In an AllMusic review, Scott Yanow wrote that Pepper "is in surprisingly strong form considering that he only had a month left to live".

Track listing 
 "Goin' Home" (Traditional) – 5:28
 "Samba Mom Mom" (Art Pepper) – 4:53
 "In a Mellow Tone" (Duke Ellington, Milt Gabler) – 5:30
 "Don't Let the Sun Catch You Cryin'" (Joe Greene) – 4:56
 "Isn't She Lovely" (Stevie Wonder) – 4:10
 "Billie's Bounce" (Charlie Parker) – 3:56
 "Lover Man (Oh, Where Can You Be?)" (Jimmy Davis, Ram Ramirez, James Sherman) – 4:57
 "The Sweetest Sounds" (Richard Rodgers) – 5:03	
 "Don't Let the Sun Catch You Cryin'" [alternate A] (Greene) – 5:19 Bonus track on CD reissue 
 "You Go to My Head" [alternate] (J. Fred Coots, Haven Gillespie) – 6:04 Bonus track on CD reissue

Personnel 
Art Pepper – alto saxophone (tracks 2, 4, 5, 6 & 8–10), clarinet (tracks 1, 3, 5 & 7) 
George Cables – piano

References 

Art Pepper albums
George Cables albums
1982 albums
Galaxy Records albums
Collaborative albums